The Zopana is a left tributary of the river Bega in Romania. It flows into the Bega in Răchita.

References

Rivers of Romania
Rivers of Timiș County